Francis Galbraith may refer to:

 Francis Joseph Galbraith (1913–1986), United States diplomat
 Francis Philip Galbraith (1896–1970), Canadian newspaper editor and chancellor of the University of Alberta